Far East Consortium International Limited (FEC) is a company with its head office in Central, Hong Kong. It was founded in 1950 by Deacon Chiu and listed on the Hong Kong Stock Exchange in 1972.

FEC is mainly engaged in property development and investment, hotel operation and management, car park operation as well as property management services. The Group adopts geographical diversification and "Chinese wallet" strategy, with business covering Hong Kong, Mainland China, Australia, Malaysia, Singapore, the United Kingdom and New Zealand.

FEC has a residential and mixed-use project portfolio across different markets in Hong Kong, China, Australia, Malaysia and the United Kingdom.

At the end of 2014, FEC signed a consortium bid agreement with Chow Tai Fook Enterprises Limited and Star Entertainment Group Limited to bid for the development of an entertainment precinct and integrated resort in Brisbane with approximately 9.4 hectares of site area. In July 2015, Destination Brisbane Consortium was selected by the Queensland State as the preferred proponent to undertake the Project. The Project entails the development of an entertainment precinct and integrated resort as well as residential development at Queen’s Wharf Brisbane, Queensland, Australia.

Senior leadership 
FEC has been led by Deacon Chiu since the company's founding 1950, until 2011 when Deacon retired and was replaced by his son David Chiu.

List of managing directors and chairmen 

 Deacon Chiu (1950–2011)
 David Chiu (2011– )

Hotel business

The company operates 20 hotels with approximately 6,000 rooms, located in Hong Kong, mainland China, the United Kingdom, Singapore, and Malaysia.

Car park operations and facilities management

FEC is among the top three car parking chain brands in Australia. The market share (2015) was approximately 20%. As at 30 September 2015, the Group’s car park portfolio comprised 351 car parks with approximately 70,700 car parking bays.

This division expanded its operation to include facilities management in Australia (mainly in Brisbane, Melbourne and Adelaide) and Johor Bahru, Malaysia.

In 1972 Far East Consortium International Limited listed at Hong Kong Stock  Exchange, specializing in property development.

Dorsett Hospitality International
Dorsett Hospitality International, formerly known as Kosmopolito Hotels International (HKEx Stock Code: 2266), is an international hotel and hospitality organization. Established in 2007, the company is a subsidiary of Far East Consortium International. Listed on the Hong Kong Stock Exchange in October 2010, the company develops, owns and manages hotels across several countries with a specific focus in the Asia region. Hotels can be found throughout Hong Kong, Malaysia (Kuala Lumpur, Johor Bahru, Labuan and Subang), China (Shanghai, Chengdu, Jiujiang and Wuhan), Singapore and the United Kingdom (London).

References

Companies listed on the Hong Kong Stock Exchange
Land developers of Hong Kong
Hospitality companies of Hong Kong
1950 establishments in Hong Kong